The 2009–10 UAE League season was the 35th edition of top-level football in the United Arab Emirates.

This was the second professional season in the history of the country.

Ahli Dubai were defending champions from the 2008–09 campaign.

Al Khaleej and Al-Shaab were relegated from the previous season.

Bani Yas Club and Emirates Club were promoted from the UAE Second Division.

The winners of the league qualified for the 2010 FIFA Club World Cup as the host representative.

Members clubs

Stadia and locations

Managerial changes

Pre-season

During the season

Standings

Fixtures and results

UFL Top Scorer 

24 goals
  José Sand (Al Ain)

18 goals
  Fernando Baiano (Al-Wahda)
  Carlos Tenorio (Al-Nasr)

15 goals
  Marcelinho (Al-Sharjah)

14 goals
  Abass Lawal (Al-Dhafra)

13 goals
  André Senghor (Bani Yas)

12 goals
  Modibo Kane Diarra (Bani Yas)
  Antonin Koutouan (Al-Jazira)
  Mohammed Salem (Al-Dhafra)
  Pinga (Al-Wahda)
  Pedrão (Al-Shabab)

11 goals
  Baré (Al-Ahli)

10 goals
  Nabil Daoudi (Emirates Club)
  Ahmad Khalil (Al-Ahli)

Season statistics

Scoring
First goal of the season: Jassim Ali Mohamed for Ajman against Al-Dhafra, 8 minutes  (25 September 2009).
Fastest goal in a match: 2 minutes – Marcelinho for Al Sharjah against Ajman (6 November 2009).
Goal scored at the latest point in a match: 93 minutes – Ali Boussaboun for Al-Nasr against Al-Jazira (5 December 2009).
Widest winning margin: 6 Goals 
Bani Yas 1–6 Al Ain (10 Jan 2010).
Al Dhafra 4–6 Al-Nasr (9 Jan 2010).
Most goals in a match: 10 Goals 
Bani Yas 1–6 Al Ain (10 Jan 2010).
Al Dhafra 4–6 Al-Nasr (9 Jan 2010).
Most goals in a match by one team: 6 Goals 
Al Dhafra 4–6 Al-Nasr (9 Jan 2010).
Bani Yas 1–6 Al Ain (10 Jan 2010).
Most goals scored by losing team: 4 goals
Al Dhafra 4–6 Al-Nasr (9 Jan 2010).
Most goals in a match by one player: 5 goals
Tenorio for Al-Nasr  against  Al Dhafra (9 Jan 2010).
First own goal of the season: Abdullah Darwish (Al-Shabab) for Al Wasl, 22 minutes (4 October 2009).
First hat-trick of the season: José Sand for Al Ain against Al-Ahli (2 October 2009).

Discipline

First red card of the season: Ahmed Ali Abdullah for Ajman against Al-Dhafra, 41 minute  (25 September 2009).

Red Card Stats
 Total red cards: 21 Card

See also
 2009–10 Al Wasl F.C. season
 2009–10 Al Ain Club season

References

External links
UFL Official Website
Football Association The UAE Football Association
National League Standings UAE League Page on FIFA.com
UAE League 2009-2010 Arabic Results and Standings

UAE Pro League seasons
United
1